The Psycho-Pirate is the name of two supervillains appearing in American comic books published by DC Comics.

Bob Frazer portrayed the character for his live action debut during The CW's 2018 Arrowverse crossover "Elseworlds".

Publication history
The Charles Halstead version of Psycho-Pirate first appears in All-Star Comics #23 and was created by Gardner Fox and Joe Gallagher.

The Roger Hayden version of Psycho-Pirate first appears in Showcase #56 and was created by Fox and Murphy Anderson.

Fictional character biography

Charles Halstead
Charles Halstead is a minor character who first appears in All-Star Comics #23, created by Gardner Fox and Joe Gallagher. He was originally a linotyper for the Daily Courier who became jealous of his boss's success; later, he becomes a criminal mastermind under the name Psycho-Pirate. He plans crimes based on emotions, hoping to ruin his boss. Nothing is known of the life of Charles Halstead before he became a linotyper at the Daily Courier. A long-time employee, Halstead was a friend and favorite of publisher Rex Morgan. Secretly, however, Halstead was frustrated with his lack of advancement at the paper and, at some point, snapped. He resolved to take what he had never been able to earn. His first target was the newspaper itself. He began to stage a series of crimes based on emotions (hate, greed, etc.), cluing the Courier with leads to his crimes.

As time passed, Halstead, as the Psycho-Pirate, became bolder. He penned a letter to the Courier, challenging the Justice Society to stop a new wave of crimes based on a variety of emotions. For example, he engendered fear into the inhabitants of a city where he threatened to unleash a deadly plague until his plan was halted by Dr. Mid-Nite. Each JSAer was given an emotion and a task to solve. With the JSA dispersed and only the Atom to guard Halstead, the Psycho-Pirate began a campaign to demoralize the publisher with constant news of despair: business failure, divorce, foreclosure—a series of lies designed to crush the spirit of his employer. To remove the Atom, he convinced the hero that the JSA had been captured and sent the Atom to rescue them. The Atom discovered the ruse and defeated the criminal's henchmen disguised as JSAers. In doing so, the Atom discovered the true identity of the Psycho-Pirate, who shot him to preserve his secrecy. Wounded, the Atom made it to the Courier just as the JSA returned and exposed Halstead as the Psycho-Pirate. Halstead was subsequently sentenced to a lengthy prison term after the Justice Society of America captured and put him in jail. He escaped by playing on the emotions of a guard, but the JSA heard of his plans from his cellmate and were able to recapture him. He continued to research the mysticism of emotions until his death sometime in the 1960s.

Roger Hayden

Roger Hayden first appeared as the second Psycho-Pirate in Showcase #56, created by Gardner Fox and Murphy Anderson.

Roger Hayden is a jailed gangster (later retconned into a young 20-year-old who was sentenced to a year in prison for attacking his emotionally abusive psychiatrist father) who is a cellmate to Halstead on Earth-Two. Halstead's dying wish, to have a legacy, prompts him to tell Hayden of a secret which he has divined in his jail years: the existence of the Medusa Masks. These golden masks bestow upon the wearer the power to project emotions onto others. Hayden finds these masks, merges them into a single faceplate and uses its powers to become a supervillain. It becomes increasingly apparent that he is addicted to absorbing others' emotions, though it causes him pain, possibly brought on by the combination of all of the masks into one. He is eventually imprisoned after a battle with Doctor Fate and Hourman.

Hayden returns to prominence when he insidiously begins influencing prominent Gotham City citizens Bruce Wayne and Alan Scott; Wayne is a former wealthy businessman and now commissioner of Gotham's police force and Scott is the president of the television station WXYZ. Initially, Scott is the most affected by Psycho-Pirate as he, in his Green Lantern persona, begins exercising his frustrations upon humanity for the failures of his private life, such as the impending bankruptcy of his station. After creating a disturbance at Gotham International Airport, he is subdued by his Justice Society comrades, who assist both Scott and teammate Flash, who had also been under Hayden's control. The Society has to next battle a civil war within their membership instigated by Wayne, still under Hayden's control and determined to rid Gotham of all superheroes.

Hayden later joins the Secret Society of Super Villains, having been recruited by the Ultra-Humanite to defeat Hayden's old foe Hourman. While he is initially successful thanks to a device the Ultra-Humanite devises that amplifies and projects Hayden's face and hence his control, ultimately both the Justice Society and the Justice League defeat Hayden and his teammates after their betrayal of fellow Secret Society members. The villains are deposited into an interdimensional rift known as Limbo.

While in Limbo, the Ultra-Humanite gains mental contact with his younger self from the 1940s and the two  are able to pull the Secret Society, including Hayden, back to that era, where they confront and are defeated by the All-Star Squadron and the time-lost Infinity Inc.

Crisis on Infinite Earths
In the Crisis on Infinite Earths limited series, the Monitor recruits Hayden—who goes on to help Firestorm recruit his enemy Killer Frost to the Monitor's team by making her fall in love with Firestorm—but Hayden is quickly abducted by the Anti-Monitor. In exchange for an entire world and all of its inhabitants' emotions to play with, Psycho-Pirate becomes an accomplice to the Anti-Monitor, manipulating a captive Barry Allen. The Flash's powers are briefly enhanced so that Hayden can control the remaining three alternate Earths at the time (Earth-4, Earth-S, and Earth-X) so that their heroes are provoked into attacking teams sent to rescue them. Psycho-Pirate's use of his powers on this scale causes him to "burn out" so that he cannot use his powers again afterward. Although the Anti-Monitor constantly belittles the Psycho-Pirate, he keeps him around in case his emotion-manipulating abilities prove useful later on and because he lacks the time to find or create someone else with the same powers. After the resolution of the Crisis, Psycho-Pirate is one of very few individuals to have full memories of the event. Driven mad by these memories, the Psycho-Pirate is shown in the last few panels of 'Crisis' in a straitjacket.

Post-Crisis
Following the events of Crisis on Infinite Earths, Hayden escapes Arkham Asylum and encounters a renegade Fifth Dimension Thunderbolt genie who has merged with private investigator Jonnie Thunder. In the pages of Infinity, Inc. #30–34, the two bedevil the members of Infinity, Inc. in a bid to destroy Jonnie's mind so that the Thunderbolt can seize total control over her body. During the arc, it is shown that the renegade Thunderbolt repeatedly electroshocked Psycho-Pirate upon recruiting him. Although this was done to "cure" Hayden of the madness he was suffering from, the electroshock had the side effect of making Psycho-Pirate lose all memories of the Crisis and the existence of parallel Earths.

Defeated, Hayden relocates to Markovia and impersonates the villain Baron Bedlam to gain power in the nation. In a story spanning two specials (Outsiders Special and Infinity, Inc. Special), the Outsiders and Infinity, Inc. defeat and imprison Psycho-Pirate.

Hayden shows up again in Grant Morrison's run on Animal Man, imprisoned in Arkham Asylum. The effects of the electroshocks given to him by the renegade Thunderbolt have worn off and Hayden's memories of the Crisis and of the prior existence of multiple Earths are restored. Psycho-Pirate ends up releasing characters destroyed during the Crisis back into the world, although many of these characters later come to realize they are just characters in a comic book. After an intervention by Animal Man, Hayden, seemingly happy, fades away into nothingness. Psycho-Pirate's happiness is due to a relief of the strain from releasing all of the forgotten characters, but he is consequently removed from reality and placed back in Limbo. James Highwater, one of the Asylum staff, is left to wear the Medusa Mask and keep the forgotten Earths contained. The other staff members come to accept Highwater as a patient, not realizing his knowledge of the missing worlds.

At some point, the Medusa Mask is held by the Force of July. Abraham Lincoln Carlyle, who shelters the Force, claims to have gotten the mask from Hayden and to have learned how to use it by watching him. He tries to use the mask, unsuccessfully, against Shade, the Changing Man as his team falls under attack from the Suicide Squad; Carlyle's heart fails him, however, and he dies.

Psycho-Pirate does not appear again until 1995 when he became part of the Underworld Unleashed crossover event. In this story, Psycho-Pirate, along with several other villains, sells his soul to the demon Neron in exchange for more power. The process results in a costume change for the character as well, with Hayden now wearing a black leather jacket and with the metal of his mask morphing into an eyepatch and replacing about half of his brain. Once again sane, and making no allusion to the events of Crisis on Infinite Earths and the existence of the Multiverse, Psycho-Pirate goes on to fight the Chase Lawler version of Manhunter before being arrested and sent to jail.

After his appearance in the Fate series, Psycho-Pirate makes two brief appearances during the Joker: Last Laugh crossover event. He is first seen locked up in the maximum security prison called the "Slab", where he is again insane and rambling of the existence of the Multiverse and is seen in his original costume. All but one eye of the Pirate's face is covered and his eyebrows have been shaved off to reduce his ability to express emotion. The Joker initiates a breakout and infection of the inmates, causing them to follow his orders and commit dangerous pranks. Because of this control, Psycho-Pirate is seen shouting "Fire!" in a crowded theatre during the breakout.

Infinite Crisis

Psycho-Pirate reappears in the JSA Classified #1–4 story arc, in which he reveals that he and Power Girl are refugees from Earth-Two. Along with several other individuals (such as Donna Troy and her evil alter ego Dark Angel), both Psycho-Pirate and Power Girl were "missed" in the restructuring of the Multiverse into a single universe following the events of Crisis on Infinite Earths. This revelation restores the original origin story of Power Girl as well.

Psycho-Pirate hopes to weaken Power Girl mentally so that she can be captured as part of Alexander Luthor, Jr.'s plot to unite and control characters who had originally been from universes destroyed during Crisis on Infinite Earths. Failing at this, Psycho-Pirate flees and vows to make Power Girl his love slave once Luthor is finished with her.

When Nightwing, Superboy, and Wonder Girl attack Luthor's base, they free all the captive heroes, including Power Girl and Black Adam, who are then confronted by the Psycho-Pirate. A coldly furious Black Adam proceeds to battle him head on. Although Hayden desperately attempts to use his powers on Adam, he simply ignores him and proceeds to gouge out the Psycho-Pirate's eyes and pushes the Medusa Mask straight through his head, killing him instantly. 

Psycho-Pirate is mentioned in Justice League of America (vol. 2) #1 as selling emotional states, such as "happy" and "ecstatic", much like a drug dealer. Among his reported clients are Signalman and Silver Ghost. Psycho-Pirate's Medusa Mask is also featured in the 2008 Raven miniseries. In the story's conclusion, Raven destroyed the mask but its power still affected scientists who studied its schematics on a computer.

Blackest Night
In the Blackest Night storyline, Psycho-Pirate has been identified as one of the deceased who are entombed below the Hall of Justice. Psycho-Pirate's corpse is revived as a Black Lantern during the event. He attacks Smallville, using his powers to manipulate the inhabitants and sway Conner Kent into attacking Superman. Psycho-Pirate murders several Smallville citizens after using his powers to enhance their emotions, as Black Lanterns enjoy attacking the emotionally overwrought.

Conner attacks Superman and aids the Black Lantern Superman from Earth 2; however, the effect of the mask wears off and Conner once more regains his senses. Clark and Conner decide to separate, with Conner confronting Psycho-Pirate. Conner manages to withstand his emotional manipulation attempts and steals the Medusa Mask, which has been reconstructed via the black ring. Using the artifact, Conner inspires hope, will, and compassion, ending the riots in Smallville. Psycho-Pirate is last seen retreating into a dark alley, followed by Conner. Conner then uses the Medusa Mask on Earth-2 Superman (Kal-L), causing the black rings to malfunction and turning both Psycho-Pirate and Kal-L back into inanimate corpses.

The New 52
In September 2011, The New 52 rebooted DC's continuity. In this new timeline, a new depiction of Psycho-Pirate first appears in Superboy (vol. 6) #23 as a member of the Twenty, a group of people who are infected by Brainiac with a psionic virus, thus giving them all psionic abilities. He was captured by the H.I.V.E. Queen, another member of the Twenty who had become a zealous devotee of Brainiac. Psycho-Pirate managed to escape and sought out the Medusa Mask, an artifact that he believed would protect him against other people with psychic powers. He then spent the next four years hiding other psychics from H.I.V.E., who were using the people they captured to power their operations in Metropolis.

During the Psi-War storyline, the Psycho-Pirate appears and takes out Hector Hammond and the H.I.V.E. Queen, who were both fighting for control of the city. When Superman arrives at H.I.V.E.'s headquarters, Hayden confronts him and drains his mind too. Hayden is then surprised by Lois Lane, who was infected with the same psionic virus by Senator Hume, yet another member of the Twenty. The two fight, with Hayden getting the upper hand. He then proceeds to make Metropolis' citizens act on pure emotion, creating riots and chaos throughout the streets. A recovered Superman, Lois Lane, Hector Hammond, and the H.I.V.E. Queen then team up to fight the Pirate and a fierce battle ensues, during which the Queen and Hammond are beaten. Superman manages to pull the Medusa Mask off of Hayden's face and incinerates it with his heat vision, defeating the Psycho-Pirate. Hayden, however, disappears in the aftermath of the battle. At the same time as he was clashing with Superman, Roger Hayden also sent an astral projection to confront Superboy and Doctor Psycho who are in New York City looking for a psychic called Shift. Shift reveals that Psycho was only manipulating Superboy to get his power. A three-way battle ensues between the three characters, which ends with Doctor Psycho being defeated and Superboy falling unconscious, only to wake up in a cell powerless.

DC Rebirth
In DC Rebirth, Psycho-Pirate and Hugo Strange are sent to Gotham as part of Amanda Waller's Task Force X. As soon as they arrive, Hugo Strange deviates from their mission and uses Psycho-Pirate to infect Gotham City's newest heroes, Gotham and Gotham Girl, with overwhelming rage and fear, respectively, causing Gotham to go on a murderous rampage. With this accomplished, Strange trades the Psycho-Pirate to Bane, who wants the Pirate to help him overcome the horrors of his childhood and his addiction to Venom. When Batman learns of this, he forms his own Suicide Squad with the Bronze Tiger, the Ventriloquist, Catwoman, and Punch and Jewelee. Together, they infiltrate Bane's prison fortress on the island of Santa Prisca and retrieve the Psycho-Pirate. Batman returns the Pirate to Gotham City and uses him to reverse the emotional damage that he did to Gotham Girl.

The Medusa Mask is taken into Batman's custody. When Batman accidentally puts the blood-stained smiley face button from the corpse of Edward Blake (the Comedian) left in Batman's Batcave by Dr. Manhattan, next to the Medusa Mask, both artifacts create an energy reaction that attracts the attention of Professor Zoom the Reverse-Flash (Eobard Thawne).  The Reverse-Flash is then killed by Dr. Manhattan, but not before the Medusa Mask manifests the erased-from-existence Jay Garrick, who frantically attempts to warn Batman and the Flash of Manhattan's evil scheme to alter the timeline so as to eliminate the Justice League and a create a darker, more cynical Superman, and a version of the Flashpoint Universe Thomas Wayne, who begs Batman to give up his costumed identity for a normal existence.

Shortly after those events, Hayden has the Medusa Mask returned to him by agents of Bane. From there, it is revealed in the wake of the aborted Batman and Catwoman wedding that Hugo Strange, Psycho-Pirate and Gotham Girl were actually working together in secret with Bane, and that Psycho-Pirate has resurrected the Flashpoint Batman from the dead to aid in Bane's scheme.

Powers and abilities
Charles Halstead has no superhuman powers, however, he is a brilliant criminal mind with an excellent grasp of human psychology and emotions.

With the Medusa Mask, Roger Hayden is able to project emotions onto other people. Often it seems to intensify emotions that a person already feels, no matter how small. Hayden later shows the power to manifest any DC Multiverse characters that had been destroyed during the Crisis on Infinite Earths or any living character, period. The Psycho-Pirate has also shown some sort of regeneration of body control, as he is able to reform after being crushed by Power Girl, and also disguises himself as a Legion flight ring.

During his 1990s revamp, the Psycho-Pirate was a "psychic vampire" able to drain emotions from other people.

Following The New 52 reboot, Roger Hayden is depicted as a psychic who specializes in telepathically manipulating other people's emotions. Examples include: calming a person to make them more reasonable or amplifying negative emotions such as fear or anger to the point of sending people into a murderous frenzy. While wearing the Medusa Mask, Hayden's emotion-manipulating powers were increased to the point where he could control all of Metropolis without straining himself. The mask also provided him with a number of other abilities, including shielding his mind against intrusion from other telepaths, levitation, draining other psi-powered individuals of their mental energies to increase his own, projecting psionic constructs in the form of giant orange snakes which he uses to attack enemies, forming a psychic link with another person, projecting his mind over tremendous distances (essentially granting him omnipresence), deflecting psionic attacks, projecting bolts of psionic energy and creating illusions.

Other versions
In the four-part Elseworlds story JSA: The Golden Age, the Charles Halstead version of Psycho Pirate is seen as a member of the Injustice Society.

In other media

Television
 The Roger Hayden incarnation of Psycho-Pirate makes non-speaking cameo appearances in Justice League Unlimited. This version lacks the Medusa Mask and is a member of Gorilla Grodd's Secret Society.
 The Roger Hayden incarnation of Psycho-Pirate appears in Batman: The Brave and the Bold, voiced by Armin Shimerman.
 The Roger Hayden incarnation of Psycho-Pirate appears in "Elseworlds", portrayed by Bob Frazer.

Film
A variation of Charles Halstead appears in Justice Society: World War II, voiced by Geoffrey Arend. This version is from Earth-2, has mind-control abilities, and goes by the name Advisor. He brainwashes his Earth's Aquaman and the Atlanteans into joining forces with the Nazis with the intention of having the former destroy the latter so Halstead can take over the world. While the Justice Society of America and the Flash of Earth-1 confront and defeat him, Halstead kills Steve Trevor in the process.

Video games
The Roger Hayden incarnation of Psycho-Pirate appears as a playable character in Lego DC Super-Villains, voiced again by Armin Shimerman. This version is a member of the Legion of Doom.

Miscellaneous
 The Roger Hayden incarnation of Psycho-Pirate appears in the Justice League Adventures issue #20. This version is a former psychiatrist who was suspended for malpractice and lost his wife and son during an alien attack in Metropolis that the Justice League was involved in.
 The Roger Hayden incarnation of Psycho-Pirate appears in a special one-shot Young Justice issue published for Free Comic Book Day.

References

External links
Fanpage about the Psycho-Pirate (both Halstead and Hayden)

Characters created by Gardner Fox
Characters created by Murphy Anderson
Comics characters introduced in 1944
Comics characters introduced in 1965
DC Comics supervillains
DC Comics male supervillains
DC Comics characters who have mental powers
DC Comics characters with accelerated healing
DC Comics telekinetics 
DC Comics telepaths
Earth-Two 
Fictional characters with absorption or parasitic abilities
Fictional characters with energy-manipulation abilities 
Fictional empaths
Golden Age supervillains